The following table show comparative officer ranks of World War II, with the ranks of Allied powers, the major Axis powers and various other countries and co-belligerents during World War II.

Table
The rank insignia of commissioned officers.

See also
 Comparative officer ranks of World War I
 Comparative ranks of Nazi Germany
 List of comparative military ranks

Notes

References
Citations

Bibliography

 
 
 
 
 
 
 
 
 
 
 
 
 

Military comparisons
Military personnel of World War II